Andrey Gustavo dos Santos (born 23 September 1974), known as just Andrey, is a former Brazilian football player.

Club statistics

References

External links

biglobe.ne.jp

1974 births
Living people
Brazilian footballers
Brazilian expatriate footballers
Expatriate footballers in Japan
J1 League players
Sanfrecce Hiroshima players
Association football forwards